Mount Mestas is a mountain summit in the southeastern Sangre de Cristo Range of the Rocky Mountains of North America. The mountain was known as La Veta Peak until 1949 when it was renamed in honor of PFC Felix B. Mestas Jr. who was killed in action during the Second World War.

Mountain

Historical names
Mt. Baldy
Baldy Peak
La Veta Peak – 1908 
Mount Mestas – 1949 
Veta Mountain
Veta Peak

See also

List of Colorado mountain ranges
List of Colorado mountain summits
List of Colorado fourteeners
List of Colorado 4000 meter prominent summits
List of the most prominent summits of Colorado
List of Colorado county high points

References

External links

Mestas
Mestas
Mestas
Mestas